Ellen Fisher may refer to:
Ellen Thayer Fisher (1847–1911), botanical illustrator
Ellen Fisher, character on Flash Forward
Ellen Fisher, see List of Little House on the Prairie characters

See also
Helen Fisher (disambiguation)